Per-Olof Karlsson (born 19 February 1942) is a retired Swedish sailor. He competed in the star class at the 1960 Summer Olympics and finished 10th, together with Sune Carlsson. His father Hjalmar and elder brother Arne were also Olympic sailors.

References

External links
 
 
 
 

1942 births
Living people
Swedish male sailors (sport)
Olympic sailors of Sweden
Sailors at the 1960 Summer Olympics – Star
Star class sailors
Sportspeople from Örebro